Procaris is a genus of shrimp in the family Procarididae. It contains the following species:
Procaris ascensionis Chace & Manning, 1972
Procaris chacei Hart & Manning, 1986
Procaris hawaiana Holthuis, 1973
Procaris mexicana von Sternberg & Schotte, 2004
Procaris noelensis Bruce & Davie, 2006

References

Decapod genera
Taxonomy articles created by Polbot
Taxa named by Raymond B. Manning